A Christmas Carol is an Australian made-for-television animated Christmas fantasy film from Burbank Films Australia as part of the studio's series of Charles Dickens adaptations from 1982 to 1985. It was originally broadcast in 1982 through the Australian Nine Network. Based on Charles Dickens' classic 1843 English story, A Christmas Carol, the adaptation by Alexander Buzo was produced by Eddy Graham and directed by Jean Tych.

Plot 
Old Ebenezer Scrooge is a cruel man for whom money has become life's only passion; he hates Christmas, even the very mention of it, lives alone and only to work. He is very strict with his sole underpaid, overworked employee, Bob Cratchit, and does not believe in donating to charity or showing kindness to anyone.

One Christmas Eve, Ebenezer Scrooge receives a ghostly visit from his former partner Jacob Marley, who had died on that date seven years earlier. In his life, Jacob Marley had been just as selfish and uncaring as Scrooge was now. He tells Ebenezer about how his soul has not had a moment's rest since his death and how his spirit has been doomed to wander the earth looking down at what might have been, had he been a different man. He tells Scrooge that he wants to spare him that same fate and that he will receive the visits of three other spirits that night.

As Jacob Marley had predicted, the first spirit, the Ghost of Christmas Past arrives at one o'clock. He and Scrooge depart together for the Christmases that have already been and, from the experience, Scrooge gains a painful memory of the person he was, and how he became what he is.

The second spirit, the Ghost of Christmas Present, shares with Scrooge the Christmases being celebrated on that same year, especially the merriment being had at his nephew Fred's home; Fred had invited him to dinner and Scrooge, as usual, had declined the invitation. From this experience, Scrooge also learns about Bob Cratchit's family, and how his youngest son, Tiny Tim, is a fragile creature supported by a crutch who may be doomed to die unless he receives better nourishment, more than his father can provide.

Finally, Scrooge receives a visit from the Ghost of Christmas Yet to Come, and finds himself a changed man after he learns of the cruel fate in store for Tiny Tim, as well as the even crueller fate reserved for himself. Tiny Tim would die and be mourned by his loving family, while Ebenezer Scrooge would die alone and unmourned.

Spared by the spirit, Ebenezer Scrooge wakes up on Christmas Day determined to keep the promise he had made to the spirits the night before and, before setting off to accept his nephew's invitation and join them for dinner, he has a huge turkey delivered to Mr. Cratchit's door. From that day, no one in London would know how better to celebrate Christmas than Ebenezer Scrooge—and Tiny Tim could wish for no more a caring friend.

Cast 
Voices of:
Ron Haddrick as Ebenezer Scrooge
Phillip Hinton as Bob Cratchit
Sean Hinton as Tiny Tim Cratchit and Peter Cratchit
Barbara Frawley as Emily Cratchit
Robin Stewart as Fred, Ghost of Christmas Past, Child Scrooge and Turkey Fetcher
Liz Horne as Martha Cratchit and Belinda Cratchit
Bill Conn as Jacob Marley, Solicitors, Schoolmaster, Mr. Fezziwig, Ghost of Christmas Present, Mr. Topper, and Old Joe
Derani Scarr as Fred's Wife and Belle
Anne Haddy as Fan

See also 
 List of Christmas films
 List of ghost films
 Adaptations of A Christmas Carol

References

External links 
 
 
 A Christmas Carol at the Big Cartoon Database
 The 1982 animated adaptation on Crackle

Australian Christmas films
Films based on A Christmas Carol
Television shows based on A Christmas Carol
Australian animated feature films
Australian children's animated films
Australian television films
Children's Christmas films
Christmas television films
1982 television films
1982 films
Ghosts in television
Animated films based on novels
1980s Australian animated films
1980s English-language films